Ithomia is a genus of clearwing (ithomiine) butterflies, named by Jacob Hübner in 1816. They are in the brush-footed butterfly family, Nymphalidae.

Species
Arranged alphabetically:

Ithomia agnosia (Hewitson, [1855]) – agnosia glasswing
Ithomia amarilla (Haensch, 1903)
Ithomia arduinna (d'Almeida, 1952) – d'Almeida's glasswing
Ithomia avella (Hewitson, 1864)
Ithomia celemia (Hewitson, [1854])
Ithomia cleora (Hewitson, 1855)
Ithomia derasa (Hewitson, 1855) – milky glasswing
Ithomia diasia (Hewitson, 1854)
Ithomia drymo (Hübner, 1816)
Ithomia eleonora (Haensch, 1905)
Ithomia ellara (Hewitson, 1874) – Ellara glasswing
Ithomia heraldica (Bates, 1866)
Ithomia hyala (Hewitson, [1856])
Ithomia iphianassa (Doubleday, 1947)
Ithomia jucunda (Godman & Salvin, 1878)
Ithomia lagusa (Hewitson, [1856])
Ithomia leila (Hewitson, 1852) – Leila's glasswing
Ithomia lichyi (d'Almeida, 1939)
Ithomia patilla (Hewitson, 1852) – Guatemalan glasswing
Ithomia praeithomia (Vitale & Bollino, 2003)
Ithomia salapia (Hewitson, [1853]) – Salapia glasswing
Ithomia terra (Hewitson, [1853]) – beautiful glasswing
Ithomia xenos (Bates, 1866)

References 

Ithomiini
Nymphalidae of South America
Nymphalidae genera
Taxa named by Jacob Hübner